The fourth series of Geordie Shore, a British television programme based in Newcastle upon Tyne, began airing on 6 November 2012 on MTV. The series concluded on 18 December 2012 with a double bill after 8 episodes, the series ended on a double bill to avoid the final episode airing on Christmas Day. This was the first series to feature Daniel Thomas-Tuck and Scott Timlin and is the highest rated series to date with 4 episodes receiving over 1,000,000 viewers. The series includes Vicky and Ricci's ongoing arguments continue to the point of the engagement being temporarily called off, James leaving Holly distraught by the announcement of him having a girlfriend, and a huge bust-up between Vicky and Sophie which has the whole house divided.

Cast
 Charlotte-Letitia Crosby
Daniel Thomas-Tuck
Gary Beadle
 Holly Hagan
James Tindale
Ricci Guarnaccio
 Scott Timlin
Sophie Kasaei
 Vicky Pattison

Duration of cast 

 = Cast member is featured in this episode.
 = Cast member arrives in the house.
 = Cast member voluntarily leaves the house.
 = Cast member is removed from the house.
 = Cast member leaves and returns to the house in the same episode.
 = Cast member returns to the house.
 = Cast member does not feature in this episode.

Episodes

Ratings

References

2012 British television seasons
Series 04